Endonuclease/exonuclease/phosphatase family domain containing 1 is a protein that in humans is encoded by the EEPD1 gene.

References

Further reading